Demir Dragnev (born 27 July 1936, Cureşniţa) is a historian from the Republic of Moldova.

Biography 

Demir Dragnev was born on 27 July 1936 in Cureşniţa. He is a member of the Commission for the Study of the Communist Dictatorship in Moldova.

Awards 
 Premiul de Stat,
 Ordinul „Gloria Muncii”,
 Medal Academy of Sciences of Moldova „D. Cantemir”.
 Honorary citizenship of the Moldovan town of Soroca

External links 
 Lista membrilor Academiei de Ştiinţe a Moldovei
 Preşedintele interimar al Republicii Moldova Mihai Ghimpu a emis un decret prezidenţial privind constituirea Comisiei pentru studierea şi aprecierea regimului comunist totalitar din Republica Moldova.
Moldovan authorities going to condemn communist regime…
Hundreds of thousands of cases to be examined by commission for combating Communism 
 http://www.privesc.eu/?p=1884 - The first press conference of the Commission, Moldpress, 18 January 2010. Video.
 https://web.archive.org/web/20100309165120/http://www.timpul.md/article/2010/01/18/5881 - interview with Gheorghe Cojocaru, president of the Commission.
 Vladimir Tismăneanu,  Un moment istoric: Comisia de studiere a comunismului
 Site-ul Parlamentului Republicii Moldova

References
 

1936 births
Living people
Moldova State University alumni
20th-century Moldovan historians
Recipients of the Order of Work Glory
Corresponding members of the Academy of Sciences of Moldova